Marlena Karwacka (born 20 February 1997) is a Polish racing cyclist. She rode in the women's team sprint event at the 2018 UCI Track Cycling World Championships.

References

1997 births
Living people
Polish female cyclists
People from Sławno
Cyclists at the 2019 European Games
European Games competitors for Poland
Sportspeople from West Pomeranian Voivodeship
Olympic cyclists of Poland
Cyclists at the 2020 Summer Olympics
21st-century Polish women